A baby planner is a private maternity consultant. They meet with expecting and new parents and offer education, resources and support. They may also recommend products, resources, services, support and additional education for their clients.

Baby planners may work with expecting parents throughout the entire duration of their pregnancy or may meet with them for just a few sessions.

While baby planners are involved with helping expecting parents plan their pregnancies and guiding new parents through the postpartum period, baby planners who do not hold additional medical licensing are not medical professionals and do not provide medical opinions, treatments, examinations or diagnoses.

Services 
While each baby planner may have their own list of services that they provide, most services baby planners offer center around educating their clients, referring their clients to specialty service providers and helping their clients to get and stay organized throughout the pregnancy and beyond.  Baby Gear consulting is the cornerstone service of baby planners and was first provided as a fee based service when baby planning was created in 2006.  However, some baby planners do not specialize in gear consulting and offer a variety of other services to meet a client's need.  Baby Planners offer many specialties and should customize their business to meet each client's need.

Services may include:
 Baby registry setup
 Product reviews and suggestions
 Baby shower planning
 Baby announcement selection or design
 Nursery organization
 Layette shopping
 Photo organization
 Child care selection education
 Referrals to service providers (Concierge Services)
 Child proofing
 Newborn care
 Infant car seat installation
 Sleep Consulting
 Green/Eco Consulting
 Doula services
 Postpartum counseling services
 Personal and fitness training

References 

Human pregnancy
Consulting occupations